"Quién Eres Tú" ("Who Are You") is a song written and performed by Nicaraguan salsa singer Luis Enrique on his 1994 self-titled studio album of the same name. It was released as the first single from the album in 1994. "Quién Eres Tú" was the first number-one song on Billboards Tropical Airplay upon the chart's debut on the week of 8 October 1994. It was recognized as the best-performing songs of the year at the 1995 ASCAP Latin Awards.

Charts

See also
List of Billboard Tropical Airplay number ones of 1994 and 1995

References

1994 singles
1994 songs
Luis Enrique (singer) songs
Sony Discos singles
Spanish-language songs